Nuclear Fire is the third album by the German heavy metal band Primal Fear. It was released in 2001.

A music video was made for "Angel in Black".

Track listing

Credits
Ralf Scheepers – vocals
Stefan Leibing – guitar
Henny Wolter – guitar
Mat Sinner – bass guitar & vocals
Klaus Sperling – drums

Production
Stephan Lohrmann - Cover art
Jens Saupe - Photography
Achim Köhler - Engineering, Mastering
Sander N. - Design
Mat Sinner - Producer

2001 albums
Primal Fear (band) albums
Nuclear Blast albums